The Hope Diamond Mystery is a 1921 American 15-chapter action film serial directed by Stuart Paton and featuring Grace Darmond, George Chesebro, May Yohe, and Boris Karloff. The screenplay was written by Charles Goddard and John B. Clymer, based on an autobiographical story by May Yohe (who also co-stars as herself in the serial).

Chapter One premiered on February 19, 1921, and the final chapter was shown on May 29, 1921. The film survives with a copy at the Library of Congress, which includes all of the hand-tinted color sequences as well.

Plot
The curse of the legendary blue Hope Diamond on all its owners is dramatized, beginning with the gem's discovery in 17th Century India. Lord Francis Hale inherits the Hope Diamond and marries showgirl May Yohe. He later gambles away the family fortune, and May deserts him.

Cast
 Grace Darmond as Mary Hilton / Bibi
 George Chesebro as John Gregge / Jean-Baptiste Tavanier
 Boris Karloff dual role as both Dakar (the Hindu servant) and as the High Priest of Sita
 Harry Carter as Sidney Atherton / Ghung
 William Marion as James Marcon / Bagi
 Carmen Phillips as Wanda Atherton / Miza
 Arthur Clayton (credited as Captain Clayton) as Lord Francis Hale
 Ethel Shannon as Lady Francis Hale
 William Buckley as Reginald Travers
 Frank M. Seki (aka Frank Seka) as Saki
 Harry Archer as Johnson
 May Yohe as Lady Francis Hope (Herself)

Production
This serial was shot on the Universal Pictures lot and a custom-built set, the "Temple of Sita," which reportedly cost $100,000 to build. The film was Boris Karloff's first major film role. A blue color tint was used on title cards in the serial with an illustration of the diamond in the background, and additional special color effects may have been incorporated into other scenes that showed the diamond as well, and evidence of such remains in the existing print of the film. Color effects have been retained in the 2014 restoration of the serial by Eric Stedman of the Serial Squadron.  The color effects of this film are so unique and ahead of their time that no other film tried to imitate them. Not until two-strip Technicolor was invented could similar visuals be attained. When watching the film, there are multi-colored tints in a single scene, reminiscent of the old hand-colored shorts of Georges Méliès. The last six chapters almost exclusively feature them. May Yohe appears as herself in each episode's opening and closing.

Chapter Titles
 1. The Hope Diamond Mystery
 2. The Vanishing Hand
 3. The Forged Note
 4. The Jewel of Sita
 5. A Virgin's Love
 6. The House of Terror
 7. Flames of Despair
 8. Yellow Whisperings
 9. The Evil Eye 
 10. In the Spider's Web
 11. The Cup of Fear
 12. The Ring of Death 
 13. The Lash of Hate
 14. Primitive Passions
 15. An Island of Destiny

See also
 List of film serials
 List of film serials by studio
 Boris Karloff filmography
 Hope Diamond

References

External links

 

1921 films
1920s action films
American silent serial films
American black-and-white films
Films directed by Stuart Paton
American action films
1920s English-language films
1920s American films
Silent action films